"Mystery Song" is a single released by the British rock band Status Quo in 1976. It was included on the album Blue for You.

The song concerns a young man's encounter with a prostitute. The B-side was "Drifting Away", from the band's 1974 album Quo.

The song was reprised, in 2014, for the band's thirty-first studio album Aquostic (Stripped Bare). It was featured in the ninety-minute launch performance of the album at London's Roundhouse on 22 October, the concert being recorded and broadcast live by BBC Radio 2 as part of their In Concert series.

Track listing 
 "Mystery Song"  (Parfitt/Young) (3.58) / "Drifting Away" (Parfitt/Lancaster) (5.05), Vertigo: 6059 146 (UK, Netherlands, Germany, Ireland, Australia) 
 "Mystery Song" / "Rain", Vertigo: 6059 146 (Italy)

Charts

References

External links 
 

Status Quo (band) songs
1976 singles
Songs written by Rick Parfitt
Songs written by Bob Young (musician)
Songs about prostitutes
Vertigo Records singles